Pray is an unincorporated community located in the town of City Point, Jackson County, Wisconsin, United States.

The community is named after Herman H. Pray (b. 1835).  In 1877, Pray was appointed the local postmaster, and the office was named after him.

 The community is centered on the intersection of Pray Road and Old Highway 54 along the Green Bay and Western Railroad line, where it used to be a train stop.  The community is located east of Waterbury and west of Spaulding along the rail line (also former rail stops), and about 2.5 miles north of the current alignment of Wisconsin Highway 54, which was completed in 1953.

Notes

Unincorporated communities in Jackson County, Wisconsin
Unincorporated communities in Wisconsin